Evil Dead is a 2013 American supernatural horror film directed by Fede Álvarez (in his feature directorial debut), who co-wrote the screenplay with Rodo Sayagues. Dubbed as a "re-imagining" of The Evil Dead (1981), the film is the fourth installment in the Evil Dead film series. It stars Jane Levy, Shiloh Fernandez, Lou Taylor Pucci, Jessica Lucas, and Elizabeth Blackmore. The story follows a group of five people under attack by a supernatural entity in a remote cabin in the woods.

Talks for a fourth Evil Dead film began in 2004, with original film actor Bruce Campbell about the possibility for a next film in the franchise. The project was officially announced in July 2011, with Ghost House Pictures producing it, Diablo Cody in the process of revising the script, and Fede Álvarez chosen as the director. Much of the cast joined from January to February 2012. Principal photography took place in March 2012 and wrapped in May in New Zealand outside of Auckland, lasting about a month.

Evil Dead had its premiere at South by Southwest on March 8, 2013, and was released in the United States on April 5, by Sony Pictures Releasing. The film received generally positive reviews from critics and grossed $97 million worldwide against a production budget of $17 million.

Another installment in the franchise, titled Evil Dead Rise, written and directed by Lee Cronin, is planned to be released on April 21, 2023.

Plot
In 2008, a teenage girl runs through the woods until she is caught by two pursuing hillbillies. Subdued with a sack over her head, she awakens to find herself tied up in the fruit cellar of a remote cabin, where an old woman is reciting incantations from a strange book. The girl pleads with her father Harold to release her. After he refuses, she reveals her possession by a demonic spirit and threatens to kill him. Harold sets her ablaze and shoots her dead. 

Three years later in 2011, David Allen and his girlfriend Natalie arrive at the cabin with their dog Grandpa, where they meet his estranged younger sister Mia and her friends Eric, a high school teacher, and Olivia, a nurse. The group plans to stay in the cabin while Mia overcomes her heroin addiction. Mia begins having serious withdrawal symptoms and complains of an overwhelming scent of decay, which the others ignore. David discovers that the cabin's cellar is littered with rotting animal corpses, a worn double-barrel shotgun, and a book called the Naturom Demonto.

A curious Eric reads an incantation from the book, awakening a malevolent force. Mia begins seeing visions of a demonic doppelgänger of herself in the woods and begs the group to leave. They refuse, thinking that she must be seeing hallucinations. Mia steals Eric's car and leaves, but sees her doppelgänger and swerves, crashing into a pond. She is chased by the force into the woods, tripping into a bramble where vines from a tree trap her. Mia's doppelgänger appears, regurgitating a sentient vine that enters her body, possessing her.

David finds Grandpa beaten to death with a hammer and goes to confront Mia in the shower. He discovers her scalding herself and tries to drive her to a hospital, but a sudden rainstorm washes out the road. That night, a possessed Mia wounds her brother with the shotgun, declares that they are all going to die tonight, and vomits a large amount of red bile onto Olivia's face before Eric manages to lock her in the basement. Olivia is later possessed. When Eric discovers her in the shower mutilating her face, she stabs him repeatedly with a hypodermic needle before he bludgeons her to death. Mia lures Natalie into the cellar and bites her hand before slicing her own tongue apart with a box cutter, and then forcibly kissing her. David helps her escape before locking Mia back in.

Eric explains that according to the book, the "Taker of Souls" must claim five souls to unleash the "Abomination". Natalie's arm soon becomes possessed and she amputates it with an electric knife. Eric explains that Mia must be "purified" either by live burial, dismemberment, or burning. The now-possessed Natalie attacks the pair with a nail gun, but David shoots her other arm off; Natalie returns to normal but soon bleeds to death from her injury.

David begins to douse the cabin in gasoline, but when Mia starts singing a song from their childhood, he decides to bury her instead. He digs a grave and heads into the cellar to retrieve Mia, who attempts to drown him. Eric intervenes but is fatally stabbed. David sedates and buries Mia, and after hearing her heartbeat stop, quickly digs her up and attempts to use a homemade defibrillator to resuscitate her. After several seemingly failed attempts, David covers his sister and says she's "at peace". Returning to the cabin, he hears a voice behind him and finds Mia alive. David enters the cabin to retrieve his car keys, but Eric's possessed corpse stabs him. David locks Mia out to protect her and shoots a gasoline can, killing both him and Eric in the resulting blaze.

With David's death being the fifth claimed soul, blood begins to rain down from the sky and Mia is attacked by the Abomination in the form of her demonic doppelgänger. Mia finds a chainsaw and severs the Abomination's legs, but it retaliates by overturning David's Jeep which lands on her left arm and traps her. Pushed to her breaking point, Mia frees herself by amputating her left hand, grabs the chainsaw, and bisects the Abomination's head before it sinks back into the ground and the rain stops. An exhausted Mia leaves to search for help, unaware the Naturom Demonto is still intact, and slamming shut on its own.

In a post-credits scene, an older Ash Williams (the protagonist of the original three Evil Dead films) is seen in shadowed profile.

Cast

Additionally, Bruce Campbell appears uncredited in the post-credits scene as Ash Williams. Briefly reprising their roles from the original film through archival recordings, Bob Dorian voices Professor Raymond Knowby and Ellen Sandweiss voices Cheryl Williams, who warns the main characters that they will die. Jack Walley also had a small role in the film as Billy Bob, a truck driver who rescues Mia after she escapes the cabin, though his scene wound up being deleted. It was restored in the extended cut.

Production

Writing
Fede Álvarez and Rodo Sayagues co-wrote the script, which was then doctored by Diablo Cody in an effort to Americanize the dialogue since English was not the writers' first language. The film was produced by Raimi, Campbell, and Robert G. Tapert, who are the producers of the original trilogy.

Raimi and Campbell had planned a remake for many years, but, in 2009, Campbell stated the proposed remake was "going nowhere" and had "fizzled" due to extremely negative fan reaction.  However, in April 2011, Bruce Campbell stated in an AskMeAnything interview on Reddit.com, "We are remaking Evil Dead. The script is awesome ... The remake's gonna kick some ass — you have my word." The film was officially announced that July.

Casting
Actor Shiloh Fernandez was cast in the lead male role of David. Initially  Lily Collins was scheduled to play the lead female role of Mia, but dropped out in January 2012, with Jane Levy replacing her the next month. Lou Taylor Pucci, Elizabeth Blackmore, and Jessica Lucas later joined the cast.

In November 2018, Álvarez confirmed the film's relationship to the original:

Filming
Álvarez, who also has a background in CGI, also confirmed in an interview that the film does not employ CGI (except for touch-ups): "We didn't do any CGI in the movie ... Everything that you will see is real, which was really demanding. This was a very long shoot, 70 days of shooting at night. There's a reason people use CGI; it's cheaper and faster, I hate that. We researched a lot of magic tricks and illusion tricks."

Release

Theatrical
TriStar Pictures released the film theatrically on April 5, 2013, in the United States, with Sony Pictures handling other markets. Fede Álvarez tweeted on January 28, 2013, that the film first received an NC-17 rating, which prompted cuts in order to obtain the contractually obligated R-rating.  The film has been rated uncut as an 18 by the BBFC for containing strong "bloody violence, gory horror and very strong language". StudioCanal handled the release of Evil Dead in the United Kingdom.

Evil Dead premiered at the SXSW Film Festival in Austin, TX on March 8, 2013.  The music for Evil Dead, composed by Roque Baños, was released by La-La Land Records in a 40-minute digital form and a 70-minute physical release, on April 9, 2013.

Home media
Evil Dead was released on DVD and Blu-ray, on July 16, 2013.  The Blu-ray exclusives include commentary from three of the cast, and screenwriters Fede Álvarez and Rodo Sayagues, and 5 featurettes, while the regular DVD includes only 3 of the featurettes. Shout! Factory released a 4K Ultra HD Blu-ray containing both cuts of the film and an exclusive poster on September 27, 2022 under their Scream Factory sub label.

Extended cut
An "extended version" featuring an alternative ending (a deleted mid-credits scene) and various other deleted clips and dialogue, some of which were featured in the original trailer but subsequently removed from the theatrical version, was aired in the UK on Channel 4 on January 25, 2015.

On October 10, 2018, Sony Pictures announced the release of the Unrated Cut on Blu-ray Disc in a two disc manufacture on demand combo pack with the theatrical version. It was released on October 23, 2018. The extended cut is  96 minutes compared to the 91 minute theatrical cut.

Reception

Box office
The film grossed $25.8 million in its opening weekend, finishing first at the box office. It went on to gross $54.2 million domestically and $43.3 million internationally, for a worldwide take of $97.5 million, against its $17 million budget, making it a box office success.

Critical response
On Rotten Tomatoes, the film has an approval rating of 63% based on 205 reviews and an average rating of 6.2/10. The critics consensus states: "It may lack the absurd humor that underlined the original, but the new-look Evil Dead compensates with brutal terror, gory scares, and gleefully bloody violence."  On Metacritic, the film has a weighted average score of 57 out of 100 based on 38 critics, indicating "mixed or average reviews". Audiences polled by CinemaScore gave the film an average grade of "C+" on an A+ to F scale.

Evan Dickson from Bloody Disgusting reviewed the film at SXSW and went on to say, "Evil Dead is amazingly gory and fun" and gave the film 4/5 stars. Chris Tilly of IGN gave Evil Dead 9/10 and called the movie a "terrifying, exhilarating and relentlessly entertaining new chapter in the Evil Dead story".  John DeFore of The Hollywood Reporter also gave the film a positive review, calling it a "remake that will win the hearts of many of the original's fans."  Independent horror review site HorrorTalk gave the film four stars out of five saying it is "the most unrelenting and bloody horror film to come out of a major studio in a very long time".  Emma Simmonds of The List commented, "Evil Dead has ample cheap shocks and few bloodcurdling frights but it builds to something gorily bravura and, if that's your bag, you'll come away satisfied. It's a while before anyone picks up a chainsaw, but boy is it worth it when they do."  Matt Singer called the film "an assault on the senses" and "a success, one that out-Evil Deads the original movie with even more gore, puke, blood, and dismembered limbs. It may not be wildly inventive, but it is effective, and plenty faithful to the spirit — and tagline — of the first 'Ultimate Experience in Grueling Terror.'"

Richard Roeper rated the film one star out of four, criticizing the film's unoriginality, the characters' lack of intelligence, and the film's reliance on gore for what he felt were cheap scares. He concluded his review by saying, "I love horror films that truly shock, scare and provoke. But after 30 years of this stuff, I'm bored to death and sick to death of movies that seem to have one goal: How can we gross out the audience by torturing nearly every major character in the movie?"

Accolades

Sequel

In October 2019, Raimi announced at the New York Comic Con, that a new film was officially green-lit and in development. Robert G. Tapert was set to produce, while Raimi and Campbell served as executive producers only, all under their Ghost House Pictures banner. In June 2020, Lee Cronin was chosen as a director with a script he wrote. Raimi chose the filmmaker from a list of potential directors, to continue the franchise. Officially titled Evil Dead Rise, the project was announced to be developed by New Line Cinema and released on HBO Max. Principal photography commenced on June 6, 2021, in New Zealand. In May 2021, Alyssa Sutherland and Lily Sullivan had been cast in the film, followed by Gabrielle Echols, Morgan Davies, and Nell Fisher in June and Mia Challis in July. Cronin stated the production was half-way completed by July 2021, while filming concluded on October 27, 2021. The filmmaker stated that the project used over 6,500 liters of fake blood during production. Evil Dead Rise is scheduled to be theatrically released on April 21, 2023.

Notes

References

External links

 
 
  
 
 
 

The Evil Dead (franchise) films
2010s American films
2010s English-language films
2010s supernatural horror films
2013 films
2013 horror films
2013 directorial debut films
American dark fantasy films
American splatter films
American supernatural horror films
Demonic possession
Demons in film
FilmDistrict films
Films about curses
Films about heroin addiction
Films about spirit possession
Films about witchcraft
Film censorship in Ukraine
Film controversies in Ukraine
Film controversies in the United Kingdom
Films directed by Fede Álvarez
Films produced by Sam Raimi
Films scored by Roque Baños
Films set in 1980
Films set in 1992
Films set in forests
Films set in Massachusetts
Films shot in Michigan
Films shot in New Zealand
Films with screenplays by Fede Álvarez
Films with screenplays by Rodo Sayagues
Ghost House Pictures films
Horror film remakes
Remakes of American films
TriStar Pictures films